José Alfonso Cavada (February 4, 1832 – March 23, 1909) was Chilean minister of foreign affairs (1876–1878) and finance (1880–1881). He was twice President of the Supreme Court of Chile (1895, 1902).

References
Los radicales ante la historia. Julio Sepúlveda Rondanelli, 1993.
Anales de la República: Textos constitucionales de Chile y registro de los cuidadanos que han integrado los poderes ejecutivo y legislativo desde 1810, Volume 1. Andres Bello, 1951.

External links
http://www.mcnbiografias.com/app-bio/do/show?key=cavada-jose-alfonso

1832 births
1909 deaths
Foreign ministers of Chile
Chilean Ministers of Finance